Scopula fimbrilineata is a moth of the family Geometridae. It was described by Warren in 1902. It is found in Angola, Ivory Coast, Kenya, Malawi and South Africa.

Subspecies
Scopula fimbrilineata fimbrilineata (South Africa)
Scopula fimbrilineata immaculata (Warren, 1905) (Ivory Coast)

References

Moths described in 1902
Moths of Africa
fimbrilineata
Taxa named by William Warren (entomologist)